Kumar Mangalam Birla (born 14 June 1967) is an Indian billionaire businessman, philanthropist, Chartered Accountant and the chairman of the Aditya Birla Group, one of the largest global conglomerates in India. He is also the chancellor of the Birla Institute of Technology & Science, Pilani and Chairman of Indian Institute of Management Ahmedabad. According to Forbes, he has an estimated net worth of US$14 billion, as of 1 October 2022.

Birla took over as chairman of the Aditya Birla Group in 1995, at the age of 28, following the death of his father Aditya Vikram Birla. During his tenure as chairman, the group's annual turnover has increased from US$2 Billion in 1995 to US$45 billion in 2021.
Today, the group is present in 36 countries across six continents with over 50% of its revenues coming from overseas operations.

Early life and education
A fourth generation member of the Birla Family from Rajasthan, Kumar Birla was born in Kolkata and grew up in a joint family in Mumbai with his parents Aditya Vikram Birla and Rajashree Birla and younger sister Vasavadatta Birla. He did his high school from Sydenham College of Commerce and Economics and a bachelor's degree from H.R. College of Commerce and Economics of the University of Mumbai. He later studied at London Business School and was awarded Master of Business Administration from University of London in 1992. He is also an honorary fellow at LBS. He is a chartered accountant from Institute of Chartered Accountants of India (ICAI).

Career

1995–2005 
In 1995, Kumar Mangalam Birla took over the family business and consolidated all the group companies under the brand – Aditya Birla Group (ABG). Birla acquired Indian Aluminum Company (INDAL) in 2000. Then in 2003, Hindalco, acquired Nifty Copper Mines in Australia, while the Aditya Birla Group acquired the Mount Gordon Copper mines in Australia. Next year in 2004, Birla acquired a majority stake in L&T cement, which was later renamed UltraTech Cement. In the same year, the Birla-led group’s flagship Hindalco Industries announced a merger with all the businesses of Indian Aluminium Company (Indal).

In 2007, Birla spearheaded the purchase of Atlanta-based Novelis Inc, which was the world’s leading producer of aluminium rolled products, by Aditya Birla Group’s flagship Hindalco. After five years in 2012, Birla’s Aditya Birla Nuvo Ltd. acquired Future Group's Pantaloon Retail Limited in India.
 In 2013, Aditya Birla Chemicals, spearheaded by Birla, acquired the chlor-alkali and phosphoric acid divisions of Solaris Chemtech Industries in India.

Birla's name surfaced in Indian coal allocation case, that traced its origin to the allocation of coal blocks between 2004 and 2009. 
In 2014, CBI filed closure report against Birla. Since 2015, the Aditya Birla Group consolidated its branded apparel business under its lifestyle retail firm Pantaloons Fashion and Retail India Ltd. and renamed it as Aditya Birla Fashion & Retail, creating India's top branded clothing company by revenues and number of sales outlets.

2016–present 
By 2016, Kumar Birla launched a new logo for the Aditya Birla Group. In June 2017, UltraTech Cement, chaired by Birla, completed the acquisition of Jaiprakash Associates' six cement plants along with five grinding units. 
In the same year, Birla revived Applause Entertainment, a media, content and IP creation studio with a focus on creating premium digital drama series. Sameer Nair, ex-CEO of Balaji Telefilms, heads the venture, part of the Aditya Birla Group.

After that in 2018, the Aditya Birla Group owned Idea Cellular was merged with Vodafone India to create India’s largest telecom service provider – Vodafone Idea Ltd. Also in 2018 under Birla’s guidance, UltraTech Cement acquired the cement business of Century Textiles while Binani Cement became a wholly owned subsidiary of UltraTech Cement.
 In 2018, Birla led Novelis entered into an agreement to acquire Aleris Corporation. The deal was closed for 2.8 bn dollars in 2020. 
Under Birla’s leadership, Aditya Birla Fashion and Retail (ABFRL) acquired the Jaypore brand and bought 51% stake in Finesse International Design that runs the designer wear label Shantanu & Nikhil in 2019. In 2020, Walmart owned Flipkart acquired a 7.8% stake in Aditya Birla Fashion and Retail by making an investment of INR 1,500 crore in the company.

By 2021, Grasim industries, a flagship company of the global conglomerate Aditya Birla Group, entered the paints business with an investment of INR 5,000 crore over three years. 
 Aditya Birla Fashion and Retail Limited (ABFRL) entered into an agreement to buy a 51% stake in the designer brand Sabyasachi. Later that year, Birla led ABFRL entered into a partnership with designer Tarun Tahiliani. ABFRL also partnered with Authentic Brands Group to take on Reebok’s operations in India and build India’s leading sports athletic lifestyle brand.

Since August 2021, Birla stepped down as non-executive Chairman of telecom firm Vodafone Idea, formed by the 2018 merger between his Idea Cellular and Vodafone India.
 In January 2022, ABFRL acquired 51% stake in House of Masaba Lifestyle.

Recognition

Birla has received several awards, including the International Advertising Association's "CEO of the Year Award" in 2016; the US India Business Council's "Global Leadership Award" in 2014; Economic Times "Business Leader Award" in 2003 and 2013; Forbes India Leadership Award – Flagship Award "Entrepreneur of the Year 2012; NDTV Profit Business Leadership Awards 2012, "Most Inspiring Leader"; CNBCTV18 IBLA "Business Leader for Taking India Abroad 2012"; CNN-IBN "Indian of the Year Award 2010"; JRD Tata "Leadership Award 2008"; NDTV's "Global Indian Leader of the Year 2007".

An educationist, Birla is the Chancellor of Birla Institute of Technology & Science (BITS) and BITS School of Management (BITSoM). He is chairman of IIT Delhi, IIM Ahmedabad and chairman of Rhodes India Scholarship Committee for Oxford University.  He serves on London Business School's Asia Pacific Advisory Board and is an honorary fellow of the London Business School.

Board Memberships and Affiliations

Chairman, Aditya Birla Group.
Chancellor, BITS, Pilani, Hyderabad, Goa and Dubai.
Chairman, Governing Council, The BITS School of Management (BITSoM) .
Chairman, Indian Institute of Management, Ahmedabad.
Member, Asia Pacific Advisory Board, London Business School (LBS).
Chairman, Rhodes India Scholarship Committee for Oxford University, England.
Director, G. D. Birla Medical Research and Education Foundation.
Former Chairman, IIT Delhi.
Former Director, Central Board of Directors, Reserve Bank of India.
Former Chairman, Advisory Committee, Ministry of Company Affairs.
Former Chairman, Securities and Exchange Board of India (SEBI) Committee on Corporate Governance.
Former Chairman, Board of Trade, Ministry of Commerce & Industry.
Former Chairman, SEBI’s Committee on Insider Trading.
Former Convener, PM’s Task Force on Administrative and Legal Simplifications.
Former Member, Prime Minister of India’s Advisory Council on Trade and Industry.

Honors and awards

Philanthropy 
As per the EdelGive Hurun India Philanthropy List 2021, Kumar Mangalam Birla and his family ranked fourth on the philanthropy list with donations mostly to the healthcare sector. In 2020, the Aditya Birla Group contributed Rs. 500 crores towards COVID relief measures. This included a contribution of Rs. 400 crores to the PM-CARES fund.

Kumar Mangalam Birla has created a 15 million pound endowed scholarship programme to support 10 full-time MBA candidates every year at the London Business School. The BK Birla Scholars Programme is named after Birla’s late grandfather Basant Kumar Birla. This scholarship programme is the largest endowed scholarship gift to a European business school.

The Birla family has built schools and temples around the India, including BITS Pilani and Birla Mandirs.

See also
 List of billionaires
 List of University of London people
 Indian coal allocation scam

References

1967 births
Living people
Alumni of the University of London
Alumni of London Business School
Marwari people
People from Kolkata
Businesspeople from Mumbai
Indian billionaires
Businesspeople from Kolkata
Kumar Mangalam
Indian accountants
People associated with the University of London
Aditya Birla Group
Indian chairpersons of corporations
Recipients of the Padma Bhushan in trade and industry